The 1996 Infiniti Open was a Doubles Tennis event in 1996.

Brent Haygarth and Kent Kinnear were the defending champions but they competed with different partners that year, Haygarth with Lan Bale and Kinnear with Dave Randall.

Bale and Haygarth lost in the first round to Kelly Jones and Matt Lucena.

Kinnear and Randall lost in the quarterfinals to Marius Barnard and Piet Norval.

Barnard and Norval won in the final 7–5, 6–2 against Jonas Björkman and Nicklas Kulti.

Seeds

  Jonas Björkman /  Nicklas Kulti (final)
  Guillaume Raoux /  Jan Siemerink (first round)
  Paul Kilderry /  Patrick Rafter (semifinals)
  Trevor Kronemann /  Brian MacPhie (first round)

Draw

External links
 1996 Infiniti Open Doubles draw

Los Angeles Open (tennis)
1996 ATP Tour